Jean-Marc Pansa (born 20 August 1997) is a French professional basketball player for Antibes Sharks of the LNB Pro B. Standing at 2.08 m (6 ft 10 in), Pansa plays as center.

Professional career
Pansa made his professional debut in the 2016–17 season, as he played in 6 matches with Nanterre 92 in the LNB Pro A, averaging 1.0 point per game.

In April 2018, Pansa declared for the 2018 NBA draft.

On June 30, 2020, he has signed with Antibes Sharks of the LNB Pro B.

References

1997 births
Living people
Centers (basketball)
French Guianan basketball players
French men's basketball players
French people of French Guianan descent
Nanterre 92 players
People from Kourou